Machina/The Machines of God is the fifth studio album by the American alternative rock band the Smashing Pumpkins, released on February 29, 2000, by Virgin Records. A concept album, it marked the return of drummer Jimmy Chamberlin and was intended to be the band's final official LP release prior to their initial break-up in 2000. A sequel album—Machina II/The Friends & Enemies of Modern Music—was later released independently via the Internet, and in highly limited quantities for the physical version.

Following the gothic and industrial rock elements established by its predecessor, Adore, Machina again proved controversial to the band's fan base and failed to reconnect them with chart-topping success. However, after the relatively brief Adore tour, the new line-up with Chamberlin and the former Hole bass guitarist Melissa Auf der Maur mounted longer international tours that returned the live incarnation of the band to a guitar-driven hard rock style.

Background and concept 
After the Adore tour ended in the second half of 1998, lead singer/guitarist Billy Corgan immediately began to work on new material, playing new songs as early as October of that year. In the same month, the four original band members convened, and decided that Jimmy Chamberlin would rejoin the band, and that a final album and tour would be mounted before the group disbanded permanently. "If you want to know what Jimmy brings back to the band," Corgan told Q, "then listen to Adore and this new record back-to-back. It speaks for itself." According to an August 19, 2014 interview with Ryan Leas, Corgan explained, "I was thinking like, you know, what the Beatles did with Sgt. Pepper’s. Why can’t we make a really different type of record? So that was my thinking going into it."

Corgan envisioned a lengthy concept album in conjunction with a musical theater approach to a tour, based around the idea of the band playing exaggerated versions of themselves, as the press and public seemed to view them. He later explained, "the band had become such cartoon characters at that point in the way we were portrayed in the media, the idea was that we would sort of go out and pretend we were the cartoon characters." From there, a story was conceived revolving around a rock star named Zero (based on the public persona of Corgan) hearing the voice of God, renaming himself Glass, and renaming his band The Machines of God. Fans of the band were referred to as the "Ghost Children".

Corgan originally wanted Machina to be a double album, but Virgin Records was not interested after the disappointing sales of Adore.

Recording 
Much like previous albums, the songs were first tracked acoustically at Corgan's house in late 1998 before the band set to work on them at their practice space and the Chicago Recording Company. The recording was conducted with the team responsible for finishing Adore – co-producer Flood and engineers Howard Willing and Bjorn Thorsrud.

The band took a break from recording in April 1999 to embark on the Arising! tour, which took the band to nine small clubs. After the tour's conclusion, the bass guitarist, D'arcy Wretzky, left the band, leaving the rest of them in a difficult position. Corgan later said, "This put a stress obviously on the full integrity of the project, because it was connected to the band not only bringing the music to fruition fully, but also the public component of being in character. I ended up in a broken band with a half-ass enthusiasm towards finishing a project already started."

Flood later remembered, "We decided that we were going to have to make a very different kind of record [...] we pretty much went back to the drawing board. Certain songs on the record are survivors from that first period, but it meant a shift in the ways songs had to be formed."

Corgan described the new recording process for Machina, now focused more on the song development than on the concept:

In the end, the theatrical qualities of the live performances and appearances were mostly abandoned. Many of the songs on the album refer to the ending of love and relationships (both romantic and otherwise), most of them obvious references to the band themselves. Corgan described "This Time" as "my love song to the band". According to Corgan, the album was structured so that the first eight tracks would be "more poppy", and the last seven "more arty". Generally, Corgan appraised the sound of the album as "a rock 'n' roll approach with pop sensibility". After the electronica-influenced Adore, Machina was a return to the distorted guitar sound of previous albums, though synthesizers and acoustic guitars were still heavily used.

Marketing and release 

Machina was released as a single album on February 29, 2000, with a bonus disc, Still Becoming Apart, available at certain stores.

A video was made for "Stand Inside Your Love", the planned first single, in late 1999, but at the last minute, "The Everlasting Gaze" was issued as the album's first promotional radio single in December 1999. "Stand Inside Your Love" was released as the first commercially available single on January 21, 2000. "I of the Mourning" was also released as a promotional single and received limited airplay. "Heavy Metal Machine" was issued as a promotional cassette but was not distributed to radio stations.

On March 9, the band went on the Thursday edition of @MTV Week at Broadway Studios in New York City for a half-hour live TV special. During the broadcast they performed "The Everlasting Gaze" as well as "I of the Mourning" after an online and call-in voting competition between three songs from Machina. The special also featured Carson Daly interviewing the band members and online chats with the band, and an interactive online video for "The Crying Tree of Mercury".

On May 23, Corgan announced on KROQ-FM that the band would be breaking up at the end of the year. The band reconvened in a studio to finish off the leftover Machina tracks, but Virgin remained uninterested, so the band released Machina II on their own in September, handing them off to fans to distribute free over the Internet.

The video for the final single, "Try, Try, Try", directed by Jonas Åkerlund, was released on September 11, 2000, but did not receive airplay in the US due to its graphic content.

Glass and The Machines of God 

Although the full extent of the original concept went unrealized, the storyline of Glass was tied to the album's release and marketing. A sequence of writings, by Corgan, were released under the name "Glass and the Machines of God" starting in the CD booklet and continuing over the Internet and elsewhere. Corgan challenged fans to solve the "Machina mystery" hinted at through it all, and in December 2000 posted his favorite fan interpretations.

The booklet artwork, a series of paintings by Vasily Kafanov, loosely told the album's story while hinting at themes related to alchemy, chemistry, metallurgy, physics, medicine, astrology, semiotics, mysticism, spiritualism, and art. The album was nominated for a 2001 Grammy for Best Recording Package.

In June 2001, a viral marketing campaign written by Jim Evans and Ben Allgood was launched via the Smashing Pumpkins message board, encouraging users to seek out mysterious websites and video clips. This early example of an internet-based alternate reality game eventually unveiled the news of a new online animated series by Sony based on the Machina story. Due in part to the changing circumstances surrounding the album's rollout, the series was shelved before any episodes were completed, though several portions have been leaked to YouTube. In a 2010 interview, Corgan commented on the abandoned cartoon, stating, "Yeah, I think you can find a few bits and pieces, but it never got finished unfortunately. That would've at least explained what the fuck I was trying to do [laughs]. I'm not even sure now what I was trying to do. But I was trying to do something."

Reception

Critical reception

According to Metacritic, the album received generally favorable reviews, scoring 66 out of 100 based on 15 reviews.

Jim DeRogatis of the Chicago Sun-Times called Machina "an exceedingly impressive and hard-driving record" and contended that it was the band's "masterpiece".

"Machina finds the quartet back at their grunge-rocking best", wrote Clark Collis in The Daily Telegraph. "[Corgan] seems re-energised as a writer and singer with the likes of 'Stand Inside Your Love' and 'Try Try Try' standing among their best work to date, while the lyrical refrain of the epic 'Glass and the Ghost Children' should please all those who like their rock music to be mean, moody and not a little psychotic."

In Q, Paul Elliott described it as "mostly, a wonderful rock album" that was "not without its faults". "'Heavy Metal Machine' is a hokey title for a dull rock song. 'Glass and the Ghost Children' sounds like mid-'80s U2 pretending to be The Doors… Often Corgan is at his most effective when he keeps it simple... 'With Every Light' is the gentlest song on Machina, and perhaps the best."

However, a few reviews were negative, such as NMEs, who criticized the album for "[not sounding] like a band in love with the potential and power of music".

Commercial performance
Machina is the second lowest-selling commercially released Pumpkins album to date, with US sales of 583,000 units up to 2005. Although it entered the US charts at number 3, selling 165,000 copies in its first week, sales declined sixty percent the second week, and continued to slide. Regarding the disappointing sales, Jimmy Chamberlin commented, "It was like watching your kid flunking out of school after getting straight A's for ten years." Corgan, in 2008, summarized the failures of the album:

Reissue
The album is scheduled to be reissued, this time resequenced as a double album with the Machina II material as was originally envisioned. The original co-producer Flood will be involved with a complete remix of all the material and sequencing into its original order as a two-disc concept album. Part of the restored concept album will be a suite simulating a live Machines of God concert, possibly with crowd noise added, with a mix inspired by Kiss' Alive!.

From July 2015, the reissue's release was put on permanent hold due to legal troubles with the record label. Corgan has said he has spent a lot of time on this and wants it to be released, but the legal issues need to be resolved first. In August 2018, Billy answered an Instagram Q&A about this. The question was "Will the Machina reissue ever see the light of day?" He answered "Just signed legal settlement today on that. So yes". Corgan announced in later Q&As that the reissue will feature completely new artwork and will not reuse any of the original Machina artwork.

As of the 28th January 2021, the NME reports that the Machina reworking is complete and Billy Corgan states that it will contain at least 80 songs.

Track listing 

Note
"Speed Kills" is not the Machina II/The Friends & Enemies of Modern Music version, but the version that appears on the "Stand Inside Your Love" single. On vinyl it is presented in its entirety; on CD, it is truncated by two minutes with a fadeout. The last four tracks are resequenced. One early release of the album often referred to as the "premaster" has an extended version of "The Sacred and Profane" with two bars of electronic drum beat at the beginning of the song, electric guitar instead of acoustic in "Age of Innocence", "The Crying Tree of Mercury" titled "The Mercury Tree", and a different, more lo-fi mix overall.

Personnel 

Band
 Billy Corgan – vocals, guitar, bass guitar, keyboards, piano, production, art direction, mixing
 James Iha – guitar, bass guitar
 D'arcy Wretzky – bass guitar
 Jimmy Chamberlin – drums

Additional musicians
 Mike Garson – piano on "With Every Light"

Production
 Bill Douglass – mixing assistance
 Flood – production, mixing
 Vasily Kafanov – sleeve paintings and etchings
 Tommy Lipnick – technical assistance
 Tim "Gooch" Lougee – technical assistance
 Jef Moll – mixing assistance
 Alan Moulder – mixing
 Andrew Nicholls – mixing assistance
 Erin Piepergerdes – mixing assistance
 Scott Schimpff – technical assistance
 Greg Sylvester – art direction
 Bjorn Thorsrud – recording, mixing, digital editing, compilation, additional programming
 Howie Weinberg – mastering
 Howard C. Willing – recording, mixing
 Thomas Wolfe – art direction
 Yelena Yemchuk – art direction
 Mike Zainer – mixing assistant

Charts

Weekly charts

Year-end charts

Singles

Certifications and sales

References 

2000 albums
Albums produced by Billy Corgan
Albums produced by Flood (producer)
Concept albums
The Smashing Pumpkins albums
Virgin Records albums
Alternative metal albums by American artists
Shoegaze albums
Art rock albums by American artists